"It's All in the Movies' is a song written and recorded by American country music artist Merle Haggard and The Strangers.  It was released in September 1975 as the first single and title track from the album It's All in the Movies.  The song was Merle Haggard and The Strangers twenty-second number one single on the country chart.  The single stayed at number one for a single week and spent a total of thirteen weeks on the country chart.

Personnel
Merle Haggard– vocals, guitar

The Strangers:
Roy Nichols – lead guitar
Norman Hamlet – steel guitar, dobro
 Tiny Moore – mandolin
Eldon Shamblin– guitar
 Ronnie Reno – guitar
 Mark Yeary – piano
 James Tittle – bass
Biff Adam – drums
Don Markham – saxophone

Chart positions

References

1975 singles
1975 songs
Merle Haggard songs
Songs written by Merle Haggard
Song recordings produced by Ken Nelson (American record producer)
Capitol Records singles